Manny Many Prizes is a Philippine television game show broadcast by GMA Network. It premiered on July 16, 2011. Hosted by Manny Pacquiao along with several co-hosts. The show will give away prizes such as money, house and lot, cars, some even coming from Pacquiao himself. The show concluded on December 2, 2012 with a total of 74 episodes.

Hosts

Manny Pacquiao

Co-hosts
Rhian Ramos
Isabelle Daza
Gladys Guevarra
Paolo Contis
Benjie Paras
Onyok Velasco
Pekto
John Feir 
Moymoy Palaboy and Roadfill
Via Antonio

Featuring
SexBomb Girls
Dang Palma

Segments
 Boksing Along
 Easy Manny
 Tsumayaw Tsumunod
 Kilig Nation
 Pacman's Pick
 PacquiaOne, PacquiaWin
 Letrumble
 Ball Pick-Up
 Word Champ
 Dear Ninong Manny

Ratings
According to AGB Nielsen Philippines' Mega Manila household television ratings, the pilot episode of Manny Many Prizes earned a 16.3% rating. While the final episode scored a 6.1% rating.

Accolades

References

External links
 

2011 Philippine television series debuts
2012 Philippine television series endings
Filipino-language television shows
GMA Network original programming
Philippine game shows